The 10th Missile Squadron  is a United States Air Force unit.  It is assigned to the 341st Operations Group, stationed at Malmstrom Air Force Base, Montana.   The squadron is equipped with the LGM-30G Minuteman III Intercontinental ballistic missile, with a mission of nuclear deterrence.

History

World War II
Established in 1939 as a prewar bombardment squadron, it was equipped with a mixture of Douglas B-18 Bolo medium and early-model Boeing B-17 Flying Fortress heavy bombers.   It trained over the US east coast flying training missions. It also had some second-line Northrop A-17 Nomad dive bombers assigned. After the outbreak of World War II in Europe it flew patrols over the Atlantic Coast searching for German U-boat activity.

Deployed to Borinquen Field, Puerto Rico in late 1940, the unit was assigned to the Caribbean Air Force, 25th Bombardment Group. The unit was called to face possible action, with its sister 1st Bombardment Squadron, in April and May 1942, however, when it patrolled the Vichy French Martinique area. By 1 November 1942, the squadron was transferred (minus personnel) to Edinburgh Field, Trinidad.

In August 1943, the 10th Squadron, which had by then been consolidated with the personnel and equipment of the old 1st Bombardment Squadron re-equipped with the North American B-25 Mitchell. A detachment was also maintained at Port-of-Spain at this time.

With the Navy taking over the antisubmarine mission, the squadron moved to France Field, Canal Zone in December 1943, where it became an element of the VI Bomber Command. The Squadron carried on patrols up and down the Atlantic coast of Panama and into neighboring Colombian waters until relieved from assignment to Sixth Air Force and returned to the United States. on 2 May 1944.  It moved to Lincoln Army Air Field, Nebraska where it became a B-25 Mitchell medium bomber replacement training unit under Second Air Force.   Inactivated June 1944.

Reserve bombardment squadron

Strategic Air Command
The squadron was reactivated in 1955 as a Strategic Air Command (SAC) Boeing B-47 Stratojet squadron. It trained in air refueling and strategic bombardment operations with the B-47. In 1961, the squadron transferred its B-47s to other SAC wings and was inactivated.

Intercontinental Ballistic Missile Squadron
It was reactivated on 1 December 1961 as an Intercontinental Ballistic Missile squadron assigned to the 341st Missile Wing at Malmstrom Air Force Base, Montana. It was initially equipped with 50 LGM-30A Minuteman Is in early 1962, becoming SAC's first operational Minuteman squadron. It upgraded to the Minuteman IB in 1964 and the Minuteman IIF in 1967. It received control of LGM-30G Minuteman III silos from the inactivating 321st Strategic Missile Wing at Grand Forks Air Force Base, North Dakota in 1996; the Minuteman IIs being retired.  It has maintained ICBMs on alert ever since.

Lineage
 Constituted as the 10th Bombardment Squadron (Heavy) on 22 December 1939
 Activated on 1 February 1940
 Redesignated 10th Bombardment Squadron (Medium) on 7 May 1942
 Redesignated 10th Bombardment Squadron, Medium on 21 September 1943
 Inactivated on 17 June 1944
 Redesignated 10th Bombardment Squadron, Light on 11 March 1947
 Activated in the reserve on 18 June 1947
 Inactivated on 27 June 1949
 Redesignated 10th Bombardment Squadron, Medium on 7 June 1955
 Activated on 1 September 1955
 Discontinued and inactivated on 25 June 1961
 Redesignated 10th Strategic Missile Squadron, (ICBM-Minuteman) and activated on 2 August 1961 (not organized)
 Organized on 1 December 1961
 Redesignated 10th Missile Squadron on 1 September 1991

Assignments
 25th Bombardment Group, 1 February 1940 (attached to VI Bomber Command after 13 December 1943)
 VI Bomber Command, 17 December 1943
 Second Air Force, c. 9 May – 17 June 1944
 341st Bombardment Group, 18 June 1947 – 27 June 1949
 341st Bombardment Wing, 1 September 1955 – 25 June 1961
 Strategic Air Command, 2 August 1961 (not organized)
 341st Strategic Missile Wing, 1 December 1961
 341st Operations Group, 1 September 1991 – present

Stations
 Langley Field, Virginia, 1 February – 26 October 1940
 Borinquen Field, Puerto Rico, 1 November 1940
 Edinburgh Field, Trinidad, c. 1 November 1942
 Detachment operated from Port of Spain, Trinidad, 27 August – 12 October 1943
 Waller Field, Trinidad, 1 October 1943
 France Field, Panama Canal Zone, 11 December 1943 – 2 May 1944
 Lincoln Army Air Field, Nebraska, 25 May – 17 June 1944
 Westover Field (later Westover Air Force Base), Massachusetts, 18 June 1947 – 27 June 1949
 Abilene Air Force Base (later Dyess Air Force Base), Texas, 1 September 1955 – 25 June 1961
 Deployed to Andersen Air Force Base, Guam, 9 January – c. 3 April 1958
 Malmstrom Air Force Base, Montana, 1 December 1961 – present

Aircraft and Missiles
 Boeing B-17 Flying Fortress, 1940
 Northrop A-17 Nomad, 1940–1941
 Douglas B-18 Bolo, 1940–1943
 North American B-25 Mitchell, 1943–1944
 North American AT-6 Texan, 1947–1949
 Beechcraft AT-11 Kansan, 1947–1949
 B-47 Stratojet, 1956–1961
 LGM-30A/B Minuteman I, 1962–1968
 LGM-30F Minuteman II, 1968–1991
 LGM-30G Minuteman III, 1996 – present

See also

 List of United States Air Force missile squadrons

References

Notes
 Explanatory notes

 Citations

Bibliography

External links
 
 

010
Military units and formations in Montana